Bryn Mawr (better known as 71st and Jeffery) is a station on the Hyde Park/South Chicago branch of the Metra Electric Line.

Along with Stony Island Avenue station, Bryn Mawr is one of two stations that run along the median of 71st Street. South Shore station is located just southeast of that end of that median. No parking lots are available for this station, but there are bus connections provided by the Chicago Transit Authority.

Bus connections
CTA
  N5 South Shore Night Bus 
  J14 Jeffery Jump 
  15 Jeffery Local 
  71 71st/South Shore

References

External links

Euclid Avenue entrance from Google Maps Street View
Jeffrey Boulevard entrance from Google Maps Street View

Bryn Mawr